Île Sans Fil (French:"wireless island") is a non-profit community wireless network that provides free public wireless Internet access to mobile users in public spaces throughout the island of Montreal, Quebec, Canada. The organization works with cafés, restaurants, bars, stores, community organizations, and individuals to provide free Internet access in public spaces. As of April 2010, the network had over 140,000 registered users (1,000+ users daily) and over 212 live hotspots. In 2016, the organization changed it operating name to Zone Access Public Montréal 

Île Sans Fil's mission is to use technology to bring people together and foster a sense of community. In pursuit of that goal, Île Sans Fil experimented in using hotspots to promote interaction between users, display new media art, and provide geographically and community-relevant information. The group was volunteer-based until 2010.

In addition to the deployment of these hotspots, a group of developers inside Île Sans Fil lead the development of the captive portal suite WiFiDog. This open source software was originally conceived for Île Sans Fil's internal use, but gained international recognition. More than 30 community wireless networks outside Montreal used the WifiDog solution: New York, London, Berlin, Vancouver, Toronto, Quebec City, Sherbrooke, Paris, Brest and Marseille.

Technical projects

WiFiDog

The WiFiDog project is an open source, embeddable captive portal solution.  It uses the physical limitations of wi-fi as an advantage to encourage hyper-local social interactions through location-based content and location-based services. Some of the content shown to users is in the form of location-specific images via Flickr. Users can send pictures to the portal pages of specific ISF hotspots by using the appropriate tag; WiFiDog will grab them via Flickr's API and present them on the portal page to subsequent users.  Another source of dynamic, interactive locative content is the use of any RSS feeds, from either the owner or other local sources.

The WiFiDog project was started by Île Sans Fil and has been used by over 30 communities and businesses across four continents.  It can also aggregate and present other content in addition to that from Flickr and RSS.

HAL
HAL is a new open source platform to distribute audio and video content to wi-fi network users. HAL assists Montrealers in discovering local artists and media producers by making their works available via wireless jukeboxes located at select Île Sans Fil hotspots. HAL provides high-speed streaming of video and audio together with location-relevant media.

Artistic and community projects

Sonic Scene
Using the ISF hotspots in Montreal, Sonic Scene explores and creates personalized, mobile audio, video and textual experiences of the city. Working with artists Michelle Teran, Kate Armstrong, Michelle Kasprzak, Alex Bell and Tobias C. Van Veen (Project Lead), Sonic Scene is an artistic intervention into both the physical and wireless city that aims to develop experiential, cultural content for public wireless reception. A fragmented artwork (sound, video, text) is distributed across a selection of ISF hotspots, encouraging the user to drift from hotspot to hotspot to experience the totality of the work. Each fragment is unique to its hotspot, developing a relation between wireless art and its physical space—one must travel to a certain hotspot to experience a particular fragment. Conversely, the casual user will encounter art on various ISF hotspots alongside information and Net access, thereby encouraging the creative use of wireless networks. This project is supported through partnership with the Mobile Digital Commons Network (MDCN).

DigitalCities
As public space, digital networks offer new opportunities for public participation, dialogue and intervention. This project will create a network database to support MDCN projects as well as conduct research with sensors in the urban environment. We will prototype a series of low-cost, task-specific wireless sensors capable of capturing and measuring urban stimuli by sending text, sound, and image over the internet to a newly established urban database, TRANS.ACT 1.3. The database will house a range of media objects contributed by users that can modified be in relation to the data collected by the sensors and used to trigger events in the database that will activate zones of public dialogue and exchange. This project is supported through partnership with the Mobile Digital Commons Network (MDCN).

CitySpeak
CitySpeak is an investigation of how data acquired from an urban environment's virtual networks can be used to investigate the same urban space's physical environment. Using the Île Sans Fil hotspots in Montreal, CitySpeak will select several locations in the city that are rich nodes of both virtual and real-world traffic and sample the geo-encoded data related to these particular locations. The dynamic qualities of the data will be processed using a database called Next Text to construct "texts" that interpret the data and to determine how the texts will be represented visually. The resulting stream of text will be layered back onto the locations using both very intimate (PDAs) and very public (large-scale projections) technology. This project is supported through partnership with the Mobile Digital Commons Network (MDCN).

In-Site Montréal
In-Site Montréal is a collection of site-specific art presented on the portal pages of five wireless internet hotspots in the Île Sans Fil network. Artists Nicolas Fleming, Maria Legault, and Virginie Laganière have created artwork that can be viewed simply by logging into the Île Sans Fil hotspots shown on the In-Site Montréal map. These playful works respond directly to the hotspots that they are situated in, so the users are treated to a creative and innovative viewpoint on the local environment they may not have expected. Curated by Michelle Kasprzak, a new media curator and Ile Sans Fil volunteer, this project is supported through partnership with Year Zero One.

Terminus1525.ca
Île Sans Fil, Wireless Toronto and ZAP Quebec users are being introduced to art by young Canadians when they use any of the 125 free public wireless hotspots operated by the three groups. terminus1525 is a project that provides free virtual studios to young Canadian artists. Using the terminus1525 studios, artists can network with each other whilst also promoting their work to the general public. By showcasing the work of the terminus1525 artists, Île Sans Fil is expanding their potential audience even further, and enhancing the knowledge of the latest trends in emergent art for its users.

Elections07 - Quebec
Election07 is a collaborative project of Île Sans Fil and ZAP Quebec with the goal of using the two groups' free wireless service to engage and inform their users about upcoming elections.

News items are automatically collected from all political parties and automatically displayed on the portal pages of ISF and ZAP Quebec so as to be immediately and conveniently visible to all users.  The news items are also collected and displayed at CivicSense in order to be accessible to non-wireless users.

Academic projects

CWIRP — Community Wireless Infrastructure Research Project
The Community Wireless Infrastructure Research Project brings together an interdisciplinary team of academic researchers and community and government partners to perform in-depth case studies of public/community-based ICT initiatives, in order to document and assess various models, best practices and benefits of public ICT infrastructure provision in Canada.

CRACIN — Canadian Research Alliance for Community Innovation and Networking
CRACIN brings together community informatics researchers, community networking practitioners and government policy specialists from across Canada to document and assess the achievements of community-based ICT initiatives.

LabCMO — L'Université du Québec à Montréal
LabCMO is an academic partnership with L'Université du Québec à Montréal (UQAM) created to explore, employ and investigate the many applications of computer-based communication to modern networks and society.

References

http://iwc-cti.org

External links
Official website

Wireless network organizations
Non-profit organizations based in Montreal
Organizations with year of establishment missing